The Satanic Mass: Recorded Live at the Church of Satan is the first released audio recording of a Satanic ritual by high priest Anton Szandor LaVey, recorded in 1967 at Church of Satan headquarters, known as The Black House. The album was originally released as a vinyl LP on LaVey's own label, Murgenstrumm, in 1968. It was re-released June 21, 1995 on Amarillo Records.

Side one of the album features an audio recording of the baptism of LaVey's daughter, Zeena. Side two features excerpts from the then-unpublished book, The Satanic Bible, recited by LaVey over the music of Ludwig van Beethoven, Richard Wagner and John Philip Sousa.

Track listing

See also
 "Satanic Mass", the final track on the 1969 album Witchcraft Destroys Minds & Reaps Souls

References

1968 debut albums
Spoken word albums by American artists
Culture of San Francisco
Amarillo Records albums
Works by Anton LaVey